Dragon Kings or dragon kings may refer to:

 Druk Gyalpo, meaning "Dragon King", the official title of the head of state of Bhutan
 Dragon Kings of the Four Seas, oceanic rulers in Chinese mythology
 The eight hachidai ryuuou of the Lotus Sutra
 Dragon Kings (Dark Sun), a 1992 accessory book for a role-playing game
 Dragon King Theory in systems theory
 Ryūō, (竜王, lit. "Dragon King"), an annual Japanese professional shogi tournament and the title of its winner.

See also
 The Dragon King (disambiguation)